The fifth season of The Good Wife began airing on September 29, 2013, airing Sundays at 9:00 p.m. The season received critical acclaim, with the general consensus calling it the series's best season. The show's critical resurgence and creative renaissance won the season the TCA Award for Outstanding Achievement in Drama and the Writers Guild of America Award for Television: Episodic Drama.

Cast

Main
 Julianna Margulies as Alicia Florrick
 Matt Czuchry as Cary Agos
 Archie Panjabi as Kalinda Sharma
 Makenzie Vega as Grace Florrick
 Graham Phillips as Zach Florrick
 Alan Cumming as Eli Gold
 Matthew Goode as Finn Polmar
 Zach Grenier as David Lee
 Josh Charles as Will Gardner
 Christine Baranski as Diane Lockhart

Recurring
 Chris Noth as Peter Florrick
 Jess Weixler as Robyn Burdine
 Jerry Adler as Howard Lyman
 Ben Rappaport as Carey Zepps
 Melissa George as Marilyn Garbanza
 Nathan Lane as Clarke Hayden
 Stockard Channing as Veronica Loy
 Mary Beth Peil as Jackie Florrick
 Michael J. Fox as Louis Canning
 Renée Elise Goldsberry as Geneva Pine
 Jason O'Mara as Damian Boyle
 Michael Cerveris as James Castro
 Jeffrey Tambor as Judge George Kluger
 Jordana Spiro as Jenna Vellete
 Hunter Parrish as Jeffrey Grant
 Eric Bogosian as Nelson Dubeck
 Christian Borle as Carter Schmidt
 Chris Butler as Matan Brody
 Carrie Preston as Elsbeth Tascioni
 Gary Cole as Kurt McVeigh
 Dallas Roberts as Owen Cavanaugh
 Michael Boatman as Julius Cain
 Miriam Shor as Mandy Post
 Mike Colter as Lemond Bishop
 Skipp Sudduth as Jim Moody
 John Benjamin Hickey as Neil Gross

Guest
 Laura Benanti as Renata Ellard
 America Ferrera as Natalie Flores
 James LeGros as Judge Adam Tolkin
 Mary Stuart Masterson as Rachel Keyser
 Rita Wilson as Viola Walsh
 Dreama Walker as Becca
 Kurt Fuller as Judge Peter Dunaway
 Dylan Baker as Colin Sweeney
 Mamie Gummer as Nancy Crozier

Reception
The fifth season of The Good Wife received critical acclaim. On Rotten Tomatoes, it holds a 100% certified fresh rating based on 20 reviews. The website's consensus reads, "The verdict is in: The Good Wife is a solid adult drama, with a delicately fine-tuned performance from Julianna Margulies and storylines that become increasingly absorbing as they progress."

Scott D. Pierce, of the Salt Lake Tribune remarked: "I cannot imagine that any series on any network is going to come up with an episode better than [the October 27, 2013 episode]. Television doesn't get any better than this." James Poniewozik of TIME: "A civil war breaks out in the office, and "Hitting the Fan" proves, if there was any doubt, why The Good Wife is currently the best thing on TV outside cable." Chris Harnick; News Editor, HuffPost TV: "'Hitting The Fan' May Be The Best Episode Ever" Stephen Marche of Esquire: "The Good Wife" is network TV's most intellectually ambitious show. It's a rare show that starts to come into its own in the middle of its fifth season, but somehow CBS's The Good Wife has managed to do it. This season has been among the strongest I've seen, and the last two episodes may be the best television produced this year. Phil Dyess-Nugent of The A.V. Club wrote that "for four years now, it's been a great example of a network show refusing to calcify and settle into formula", citing the scene when Kalinda tells Robyn that 'Losing a job changes you', which he suggests "could be on this show's coat of arms". Patrick Freyne of the Irish Times wrote that the series is "the best-made, most nuanced show on television".

The season received three Golden Globe Award nominations, two TCA Award nominations, a field-leading five Critics' Choice Television Award nominations, and five Primetime Emmy Award nominations, including mentions for its stars Julianna Margulies, Josh Charles, and Christine Baranski. Margulies ended up winning the Primetime Emmy Award for Outstanding Lead Actress in a Drama Series for her performance in "The Last Call".

Awards and nominations

Primetime Emmy Awards
Won for Outstanding Lead Actress in a Drama Series (Julianna Margulies for "The Last Call")
Nomination for Outstanding Supporting Actress in a Drama Series (Christine Baranski for "The Last Call")
Nomination for Outstanding Supporting Actor in a Drama Series (Josh Charles for "Hitting the Fan")
Nomination for Outstanding Guest Actor in a Drama Series (Dylan Baker for "Tying the Knot")
Nomination for Outstanding Casting for a Drama Series (Mark Saks)

Bruce Springsteen album promotion
During the January 12, 2014 episode, "We, the Juries", snippets of three songs from Bruce Springsteen's new album, High Hopes, which was released two days later, were featured. CBS struck a deal with Springsteen's record label to promote the new album, which will also be streamed through CBS.com from 10pm on January 12 to 7pm on January 13. Writer Keith Eisner, who is from Springsteen's home state of New Jersey said the deal came together after the season's 12th episode had been written and filmed, but not yet edited. He said when he heard of Springsteen's songs being used he literally jumped up and down in excitement. "High Hopes", "The Ghost of Tom Joad" and "Hunter of Invisible Game" were the songs featured at various points in the episode. CBS said this was a way to gain wider exposure for the album in an unconventional way, and lure his baby boomer fans to the show and the top-rated network's website.

Episodes

U.S. Nielsen ratings

References

2013 American television seasons
2014 American television seasons
5